The 1975 Ballon d'Or,  given to the best football player in Europe as judged by a panel of sports journalists from UEFA member countries, was awarded to the Soviet forward Oleg Blokhin on 30 December 1975. There were 26 voters, from Austria, Belgium, Bulgaria, Czechoslovakia, Denmark, East Germany, England, Finland, France, Greece, Hungary, Italy, Luxembourg, the Netherlands, Norway, Poland, Portugal, Republic of Ireland, Romania, Soviet Union, Spain, Sweden, Switzerland, Turkey, West Germany and Yugoslavia. Blokhin became the second Soviet (and the first Ukrainian) footballer who won the trophy after Lev Yashin (1963).

Rankings

References

External links
 France Football Official Ballon d'Or page

1975
1975–76 in European football